, known as , is an American actor and model in Japan. He was born in Newport Beach, California. He is best known for his portrayal of Ken Hisatsu/Geki Chopper in the 2007 Super Sentai series Juken Sentai Gekiranger.

Biography

Sotaro was born in Newport Beach, California. He attended Corona del Mar High School and University High School in Irvine, where he was the club president for the Japanese Club. He is attended at Keio University in Japan as an economics major.

Filmography

External links
Sotaro's Official Website
Personal blog

1986 births
21st-century Japanese male actors
American male actors of Japanese descent
American models of Japanese descent
American emigrants to Japan
Japanese male models
Keio University alumni
Living people
Male actors from Newport Beach, California